Protereotita (Priority), is the debut solo album by Greek singer Helena Paparizou, released on 27 June 2004 by Sony Music Greece. The album's first single, Anapandites Kliseis, was released as a CD-single prior to the album's release and reached number 1 on the Greek IFPI singles chart. The album was also re-released twice in Greece, and once internationally as My Number One. Overall, there are five different editions available of the album. The original album was only a mild success, however, following Paparizou's victory in the Eurovision Song Contest the Euro Edition peaked at number one on the charts and was certified platinum by the IFPI. The album was later certified double platinum in early 2006; as IFPI was making a transition in lowering their sales thresholds at that time, this would imply sales of at least 60,000 copies, although sales of up to 87,000 have been claimed.

Album information
Protereotita marked Paparizou's first solo-album after her break-up with Antique. Released in June 2004, the album included five singles: "Anapantites Kliseis", "Treli Kardia", "Katse Kala", "Anditheseis" and "Stin Kardia Mou Mono Thlipsi", which were released as either CD singles or radio single.

Before her participation in the Eurovision Song Contest 2005, Paparizou re-released the album with the title "Protereotita: Euro-Edition" on 31 March 2005.  The album included a bonus CD which contained 11 new tracks that included her Greek national final songs, including "My Number One". "My Number One" was Paparizou's second CD single to go to number 1 on the Greek charts.

At the end of 2005 Paparizou re-released the album for the third and final time in Greece and Cyprus as Protereotita: Euro-Edition + Mambo!. This edition included all of the songs from Protereotita: Euro Edition and the songs from the "Mambo!" CD single. Protereotita -including both re-releases- become a huge commercial success for Paparizou, considering that the album was released only in Greece and Cyprus.

Helena released her first international album  with the title My Number One on 17 May 2005.  My Number One included most of the songs from Protereotita: Euro-Edition, and was released in many parts of Europe including Sweden, Turkey, Switzerland, Hungary, Finland, Slovenia, Russia, Denmark, Poland, the Netherlands and Spain.

Track listing

Original

Euro Edition (2005)

My Number One (2005)

Protereotita: Euro Edition + Mambo! (2005)

Singles

Greek singles

The first single to be released from the original album Protereotita was "Anapandites Kliseis". "Anapantites Kliseis"' was double A-side single with "Treli Kardia." The single peaked at number 1 for a successful 6 weeks. After the release of the CD single a number of singles (video clips) followed throughout the year. The first being "Katse Kala", which was followed by "Antitheseis" then the last being "Stin Kardia Mou Mono Thlipsi". Then, "Anamnisis" was released as a radio-promo-only single.

"Anapandites Kliseis" (CD) (Directed by Manolis Tzirakis)
"Treli Kardia" (Directed by Giorgos Gavalos/View Studio)
"Katse Kala" (Directed by Giorgos Gavalos/View Studio)
"Antitheseis" (Directed by Manolis Tzirakis)
"Stin Kardia Mou Mono Thlipsi" (Directed by Manolis Tzirakis)
"My Number One" (CD) (Directed by Kostas Kapetanidis)
"The Light in Our Soul" (CD) (Directed by Manolis Tzirakis)
"Mambo!" (CD) (Directed by Manolis Tzirakis)

International singles
The following singles were released internationally off of My Number One:'

"My Number One"
The first single released from My Number One was Elena's winning song from the 2005 Eurovision Song Contest "My Number One". The single went to number one in Sweden for 4 very successful weeks. The single stayed on the charts for 29 weeks overall. In Europe it was a big hit, charting in many countries in singles charts and having airplay success.

"The Light in Our Soul"
The second single to be released from the album was "The Light in Our Soul" which was another successful single from the album and peaked at number three. The single was only released in Sweden. The song stayed a hit in Sweden over the summer and stayed on the charts for 24 weeks. It was still in the Swedish charts in early 2006. It had airplay success in certain european countries even if it wasn't released anywhere except Sweden.

"A Brighter Day"
The last single to be released from the album was "A Brighter Day." This was in Elena's least successful single to date as a solo artist in Sweden. The single reached number twenty-four (#24) and stayed on the charts for 10 weeks. The reason the single peaked at a low chart position was due to Elena promoting her new single "Mambo!" in Greece and did not have the time to promote "A Brighter Day" in Sweden. Also, no video was filmed for the single which might have contributed to its lack of success.

Release history

Charts
Protereotita was a very successful album in Cyprus and Greece, where it peaked at number 1 for eight weeks. This was Elena's most successful album to date in Greece as a solo artist. The success of the album continued to grow as Elena released singles and video clips from the album throughout the year of 2004 up to Elena was picked for the 2005 Eurovision Song Contest in Kiev which she won. On 2007 Elena was awarded with the European Borders Breakers Award in Cannes, for the sales of her international releasing.

My Number One debuted on the Swedish charts at 34 and peaked at 13, remaining in that position for two weeks. The album stayed on the chart for 22 weeks (5½ months) with its last charted position 36 on 27 October 2005.

Certifications 

| Cyprus (IFPI Cyprus)|| Platinum || 10,000*
|-

References

Helena Paparizou albums
2004 debut albums
2005 albums
Greek-language albums
Sony Music Greece albums
European Border Breakers Award-winning albums

pl:Protereotita#My Number One (album)